{{DISPLAYTITLE:dTDP-6-deoxy-L-talose 4-dehydrogenase (NAD+)}}

DTDP-6-deoxy-L-talose 4-dehydrogenase (NAD+) (tll (gene name)) is an enzyme with systematic name dTDP-6-deoxy-beta-L-talose:NAD+ 4-oxidoreductase. This enzyme catalyses the following chemical reaction

 dTDP-6-deoxy-beta-L-talose + NAD+  dTDP-4-dehydro-6-deoxy-beta-L-mannose + NADH + H+

The enzyme from bacterium Aggregatibacter actinomycetemcomitans participates in the biosynthesis of the serotype c-specific polysaccharide antigen.

References

External links 
 

EC 1.1.1